The Wages of Fear is the second studio album by English indie rock band Tellison. It was released on 13 June 2011 through Naim Edge Records. The album was made available to listen to on SoundCloud on 27 April 2011.

Track listing

References

2011 albums
Naim Edge Records albums
Tellison albums